Farmington is a community in the Canadian province of Nova Scotia, located in  Cumberland County . It was named for Farmington, Gloucestershire in England.

References

 Farmington on Destination Nova Scotia

Communities in Cumberland County, Nova Scotia
General Service Areas in Nova Scotia